Destiny is a 2nd division female professional paintball team. The team was founded by player Bea Paxson (née Youngs) and her husband Mike Paxson.

References 

Paintball teams
Women's sports teams